Pseuderanthemum laxiflorum is a species of plant in the family Acanthaceae.

laxiflorum